Ardisia scortechinii is a species of plant in the family Primulaceae. It is a tree endemic to Peninsular Malaysia.

References

scortechinii
Endemic flora of Peninsular Malaysia
Trees of Peninsular Malaysia
Data deficient plants
Taxonomy articles created by Polbot